Martin Ernest Reasoner (born February 26, 1977) is an American former professional ice hockey center who played in the National Hockey League (NHL) with the St. Louis Blues, Edmonton Oilers, Boston Bruins, Florida Panthers, Atlanta Thrashers and New York Islanders. He is currently in a player development coaching role within the New York Islanders organization.

Playing career
As a youth, Reasoner played in the 1990 and 1991 Quebec International Pee-Wee Hockey Tournaments with a minor ice hockey team from Rochester, New York.

Reasoner was selected in the first round of the 1996 NHL Entry Draft, 14th overall, by the St. Louis Blues. This followed two years of high school hockey at McQuaid Jesuit High School, two years of high school at Deerfield Academy in Massachusetts and three years at Boston College (BC), where he was named Rookie of the Year his freshman year, and named All-American his junior season when he led the Eagles ice hockey team to the NCAA finals. He skated alongside BC legend Brian Gionta. Reasoner split 1998–2001 between the Blues and their top minor league affiliate, the Worcester IceCats of the American Hockey League (AHL). In 2003, he was voted a starter on the IceCats' tenth-anniversary All-Time Team.

On July 1, 2001, Reasoner (along with Jochen Hecht and Jan Horacek) was traded to the Edmonton Oilers in exchange for Oilers' captain Doug Weight and Michel Riesen. In November 2003, Reasoner suffered a severe knee injury when he crashed into the end boards. During the 2004–05 NHL lockout, Reasoner played 11 games for EC Red Bull Salzburg of the Austrian League. On August 9, 2005, Reasoner signed a one-year contract extension with the Oilers. On March 9, 2006, Reasoner (along with Yan Stastny and a second-round pick in the 2006 NHL Entry Draft (used to select Milan Lucic)) was traded to the Boston Bruins in exchange for Sergei Samsonov.

On July 4, 2006, as a free agent, Reasoner signed a two-year contract to return to the Edmonton Oilers. After the expiry of his deal, on July 17, 2008, Reasoner signed a contract with the Atlanta Thrashers. On June 24, 2010, Reasoner (along with the Thrashers' first- (24th overall) and second-round picks in the 2010 NHL Entry Draft (used to select Joey Crabb and Jeremy Morin respectively)) was traded to the Chicago Blackhawks in exchange for Dustin Byfuglien, Ben Eager, Brent Sopel and Akim Aliu. One month later, on July 22, 2010, due to salary cap restrictions within the Blackhawks' organization, Reasoner was traded to the Florida Panthers in exchange for center Jeff Taffe. After the Panthers traded away captain Bryan McCabe, Reasoner was named an assistant captain.

On July 1, 2011, Reasoner signed a two-year contract with the New York Islanders.

Career statistics

Regular season and playoffs

International

Awards and honors

References

External links

1977 births
Living people
American men's ice hockey centers
Atlanta Thrashers players
Boston Bruins players
Boston College Eagles men's ice hockey players
EC Red Bull Salzburg players
Edmonton Oilers players
Florida Panthers players
Ice hockey players from New York (state)
National Hockey League first-round draft picks
New York Islanders coaches
New York Islanders players
People from Mendon, New York
St. Louis Blues draft picks
St. Louis Blues players
Worcester IceCats players
AHCA Division I men's ice hockey All-Americans